Simcoe—Grey is a provincial electoral district in Ontario, Canada, that has been represented in the Legislative Assembly of Ontario since 1999.

It was created in 1996 from parts of Barrie—Simcoe—Bradford, Bruce—Grey, Simcoe Centre, Simcoe North, Wellington—Grey—Dufferin—Simcoe and York—Simcoe.

It consists of the municipalities of Blue Mountains, Collingwood, Clearview, Wasaga Beach, Springwater, Essa, New Tecumseth and Adjala-Tosorontio.  It had a population of 117,505 in 2001, and an area of 2,515 km².

History
The provincial electoral district was created in 1999 when provincial ridings were defined to have the same borders as federal ridings.

It consisted initially of:
 the part of the County of Simcoe lying to the west of and including the Town of New Tecumseth and the Township of Essa, to the west of and excluding the City of Barrie, to the east of and including the townships of Vespra and Flos, and to the south of and excluding the Township of Tiny;
 in the County of Grey, the Town of Thornbury, the villages of Flesherton and Markdale, and the townships of Artemesia, Collingwood and Osprey.

In 2003, it was given its current boundaries as described above.

Members of Provincial Parliament
This riding has elected the following members of the Legislative Assembly of Ontario:

Wilson resigned from cabinet and the Progressive Conservative caucus on November 2, 2018, and continued the term as an Independent MPP.

Election results

 

 

 

		

		

|align="left" colspan=2|Progressive Conservative hold  
|align="right"|Swing
|align="right"|  +3.37  

^ Change based on redistributed results

2007 electoral reform referendum

Sources

Elections Ontario Past Election Results
Map of riding for 2018 election

Ontario provincial electoral districts
Collingwood, Ontario

ru:Симко — Грей